Vardhaman Sthanakvasi Jain Shravak Sangh - वर्धमान स्थानकवासी जैन श्रावक संघ is a Jain religious body founded in India in 1952.

Acharya Atmaramji  was the first acharya of Shraman Sangh from 1952 to 1962.

Acharya Anand Rishiji Maharaj (1900-1992) was the second acharya of the Shraman Sangh from 1964 to 1992.

Acharya Shiv Muni ji Maharaj is the current acharya of the Shraman Sangh.

References

Jain organisations